The Westland Whirlwind helicopter was a British licence-built version of the U.S. Sikorsky S-55/H-19 Chickasaw. It primarily served with the Royal Navy's Fleet Air Arm in anti-submarine and search and rescue roles.

Design and development

In 1950, Westland Aircraft, already building the American Sikorsky S-51 under licence as the Westland Dragonfly, purchased the rights to manufacture and sell Sikorsky's larger Sikorsky S-55 helicopter. While a Sikorsky-built pattern aircraft was flown by Westland in June 1951, converting the design to meet British standards (including the provision of a revised main-rotor gearbox), was time-consuming, and the first  prototype British aircraft, registered G-AMJT, powered by the 600 hp Pratt & Whitney R-1340-40 Wasp did not fly until August 1953. This was followed by ten Whirlwind HAR.1s, which entered service shortly afterwards. They served in non-combat roles, including search and rescue and communications functions. The HAR.3 had a larger 700 hp Wright R-1300-3 Cyclone 7 engine.

The performance of early versions was limited by the power of the American Wasp or Cyclone engines, and in 1955, the HAR.5, powered by an uprated engine, the Alvis Leonides Major, flew for the first time. This was followed by the similarly powered HAS.7, which became the first British helicopter designed for anti-submarine warfare in the front-line when it entered service in 1957. It could either be  equipped with a dipping Sonar for submarine detection or carry a torpedo, but could not carry both simultaneously, so sonar equipped "Hunters" were used to direct torpedo armed "Killers". The HAS.7 was powered by a 750 hp (560 kW) Alvis Leonides Major 755/1 radial engine.

In 1960 Westland introduced a Whirlwind powered by the 1,000 hp Bristol Siddeley Gnome turboshaft, the greater power giving much improved performance over the earlier piston-engined variants; helicopters receiving this modification were redesignated as the HAR.9. The Gnome featured an early computer controlled fuel system that removed variations in engine power and made for much easier handling by the pilot.

More than 400 Whirlwinds were built, of which nearly 100 were exported to foreign customers.

Operational service

848 Naval Air Squadron of the Royal Navy's Fleet Air Arm was the first squadron to receive HAR.1s, which replaced Sikorsky-built HAR.21 versions of the Whirlwind, for utility and search-and-rescue service from July 1954. After entering service with the Royal Navy, the Whirlwind also entered service with the Royal Air Force and French Navy,  which received 37 Whirlwind HAR.2 between 1954 and 1957.

The Royal Air Force Search and Rescue Force used Whirlwinds painted in overall yellow for rescuing people in distress around the coast of the United Kingdom. Westland Wessex, and eventually Westland Sea King, helicopters later supplemented and eventually replaced Whirlwinds in this role.

Variants

WS-55 Series 1  44 built; American engines (Pratt & Whitney R-1340-40 Wasp), transport helicopters for military and civilian use
WS-55 Series 2  19 built; Alvis engines (Alvis Leonides Major 755), civilian use
WS-55 Series 3  5 built; Gnome turboshaft (Bristol Siddeley Gnome 101), civilian use
HAR.1  10 built; RN service; Search and rescue
HAR.2  33 built; RAF service from 1955
HC.2  RAF service
HAR.3  25 built; RN service; Wright R-1300 Cyclone 7 engine
HAR.4  24 built; Improved HAR.2 for hot and high conditions, RAF service
HAR.5  3 built; Alvis Leonides Major engine and a 3 degree droop of the tail boom for increased main rotor clearance; RN service
HAR.6  1 ordered with Turbomeca Twin Turmo engine but completed as an HAR.5
HAR.7  40 built; RN duties – 6 converted to HAR.9's
HAS.7  89 built; RN anti-submarine duties – 1 torpedo; 12 used as Royal Marine transports, 6 converted to HAR.9's
HCC.8  2 built; Royal Flight transport, VVIP later converted to HAR.10's
HAR.9  12 conversions of HAS.7 and HAR.7 with a Bristol Siddeley Gnome gas turbine replacing the Leonides Major engine, RN service
HC.10  RAF service
HAR.10  68 built; powered by a Bristol Siddeley Gnome turboshaft, RAF service, transport and air-sea rescue
HCC.12  2 built; Royal Flight,

The model numbers for the US-built evaluation models were
HAR.21  10 built by Sikorsky; rescue. Equivalent to US Marine HRS-2.
HAS.22  15 built by Sikorsky; anti-submarine. Equivalent to HO4S-3.

Operators

Military operators

 19 helicopters

Civil operators

Surviving aircraft

Cyprus
 XD184 – HAR.10 on static display at RAF Akrotiri as a gate guardian

Germany
 XD186 – HAR.10 on static display at Flugausstellung Hermeskeil in Hermeskeil, Rhineland-Palatinate.
 XP352 – HAR.10 on static display at Flugausstellung Hermeskeil in Hermeskeil, Rhineland-Palatinate.

Netherlands
 XG576 – HAR.3 on static display at PS Aero in Baarlo, Limburg.

United Kingdom
 WA.113 – Series 3 on static display at The Helicopter Museum in Weston-super-Mare, Somerset.
 WA.298 – Series 3 on static display at the Midland Air Museum in Baginton, Warwickshire.
 WV198 – HAR.21 on static display at the Solway Aviation Museum in Crosby-on-Eden, Cumbria.
 XA864 – HAR.1 in storage at the Fleet Air Arm Museum in Yeovil, Somerset.
 XA870 – HAR.1 on static display at the South Yorkshire Aircraft Museum in Doncaster, South Yorkshire. Owned by the Yorkshire Helicopter Preservation Group.
 XD163 – HAR.10 on static display at The Helicopter Museum in Weston-super-Mare, Somerset.
 XG574 – HAR.3 on display at the Fleet Air Arm Museum in Yeovil, Somerset.
 XG588 – Series 3 on static display at East Midlands Aeropark in Castle Donington, Leicestershire.
 XG594 – HAS.7 in storage at the Fleet Air Arm Museum in Yeovil, Somerset.
 XJ398 – HAR.10 on static display at the South Yorkshire Aircraft Museum in Doncaster, South Yorkshire. Owned by the Yorkshire Helicopter Preservation Group.
 XJ723 – HAR.10 on static display at Morayvia in Kinloss, Moray.
 XJ726 – HAR.10 on static display at Caernarfon Airworld Museum in Dinas Dinlle, Gwynedd.
 XJ729 – HAR.10 airworthy with Historic Helicopters in Crewkerne, Somerset.
 XK936 – HAS.7 on static display at the Imperial War Museum Duxford in Duxford, Cambridgeshire.
 XK940 – HAS.7 on static display at The Helicopter Museum in Weston-super-Mare, Somerset.
 XL853 – HAS.7 in storage at the Fleet Air Arm Museum in Yeovil, Somerset.
 XL875 – HAR.9 at Air Service Training in Perth.
 XN258 – HAR.9 on static display at the North East Land, Sea and Air Museums in Sunderland, Tyne and Wear.
 XN304 – HAS.7 on static display at the Norfolk and Suffolk Aviation Museum in Flixton, Suffolk.
 XN380 – HAS.7 under restoration for static display at the RAF Manston History Museum in Ramsgate, Kent.
 XN386 – HAS.9 on static display at the South Yorkshire Aircraft Museum in Doncaster, South Yorkshire. Owned by the Yorkshire Helicopter Preservation Group.
 XP299 – HAR.10 on static display at the Royal Air Force Museum London in London.
 XP345 – HAR.10 on static display at the South Yorkshire Aircraft Museum in Doncaster, South Yorkshire. Owned by the Yorkshire Helicopter Preservation Group.
 XP346 – HAR.10 on static display at All Things Wild in Evesham, Worcestershire.
 XP355 – HAR.10 on static display at the City of Norwich Aviation Museum in Horsham St Faith, Norfolk.
 XR453 – HAR.10 on static display at RAF Odiham in Odiham, Hampshire.
 XR485 – HAR.10 on static display at the Norfolk and Suffolk Aviation Museum in Flixton, Suffolk.
 XR486 – HCC.12 on static display at The Helicopter Museum in Weston-super-Mare, Somerset.

Specifications (Whirlwind HAS.7)

In Fiction 
The character of Harold the Helicopter, from the British television show Thomas & Friends, was based on a Westland Whirlwind with fitted pontoons.

See also

References

Citations

Bibliography

James, Derek M. Westland Aircraft since 1915. London: Putnam Aeronautical Books, 1991. .

Thetford, Owen. British Naval Aircraft since 1912. London:Putnam, 1978. .
"Wings Over the Gulf: The Qatari Emiri Air Force". Air International, September 1988, Vol. 35, No. 3. pp. 135–144.

External links

 Navy News
 Helicopter museum
 Westland Whirlwind page at helis.com database
 

1950s British anti-submarine aircraft
1950s British military utility aircraft
Military helicopters
Search and rescue helicopters
1950s British helicopters
Whirlwind (helicopter)
Aircraft first flown in 1953
Single-engined piston helicopters